TS Laevad ("TS Ships") is an Estonian ferry company which operates two routes between the Estonian mainland and the islands of Hiiumaa and Muhu in the Baltic Sea. Muhu is connected by a causeway to Estonia's largest island, Saaremaa.

The company is a fully owned subsidiary of the Port of Tallinn, which is in turn majority-owned by the Estonian state. The state subsidises the ferry routes with a sum of over €20 million per annum.

The company operates five ice class ferries, four of which were purpose-built, with an additional hybrid ferry expected to be delivered in 2024.

Routes
Two routes across the Väinameri are operated by TS Laevad.

History

Contract period 2016–2026

TS Laevad replaced the previous operator, SLK, on 1 October 2016 after submitting a public procurement bid 64 million euros less than its predecessor. It is contracted to operate the routes until 30 September 2026.

As none of TS Laevads new ferries were delivered in time for the start of the company's contract, three vessels from Vjatšeslav Leedo's Saaremaa Shipping Company (SLK) were chartered as an interim solution. The Sefine Shipyard in Turkey and the Remontowa shipyard in Poland paid TS Laevad a total of nearly €11 million in late fees. All four new ferries were in service by the end of April 2017.

In 2019 the ferry Tõll had batteries installed which were expected to reduce the vessel's diesel consumption by 20%. It thus became the first hybrid passenger vessel in Estonia. 

In 2022, the company's ferries carried a total of 2.3 million passengers and 1.1 million vehicles. 72 percent of total passengers sailed on the Saaremaa route, with the remainder on the Hiiumaa route. The busiest month was July, with 394,000 passengers. The least busy month was February, with 96,000 passengers.

Accidents and disruptions to service
On 28 July 2017, the ferry Tiiu struck the seabed twice and sustained hull damage en route from Rohuküla to Heltermaa. The incident was caused by a controls failure on autopilot. While Tiiu underwent repairs at Turku Repair Yard in Finland she was replaced by the chartered Hiiumaa for a period of six weeks.

In the spring of 2018 ferry services to Hiiumaa were periodically suspended due to low water levels in the Väinameri. The minister responsible blamed the cancellations on inadequate dredging in the Rukki Channel, through which ferries pass between Rohuküla and Heltermaa.

From mid-March to early May in 2020, TS Laevad reduced the frequency of its services due to the coronavirus pandemic. Travel to the islands was restricted to residents and the number of passengers reduced by 92 percent compared to the previous year.

On 22 July 2021 Tõll collided with the berth at Kuivastu Harbour causing damage to the berth, the ferry and some vehicles on board including that of Estonian president Kersti Kaljulaid. Tõll was out of service for over two weeks during the peak summer season causing queues of up to two hours. The company stated that the collision was caused by a technical failure resulting in a loss of engine power as the ferry approached the berth.Baltic Times. TS Laevad carries record number of 102,851 passengers last week.

Future developments
The Estonian Ministry of Economic Affairs is assessing the option of building a bridge or tunnel connection between the mainland and Muhu across the Suur Strait. It is expected to be determined by 2026 whether a bridge, tunnel or continued ferry operation will be the preferred option.Postimees Majandus. Sild, tunnel või parvlaevad – selgus Suure väina püsiühenduse osas saabub 2026. aastaks.

Ferries of TS Laevad
{| class="wikitable"
! Ferry
! Usual route
! In service
! Shipyard
! Home port
! Capacity
! Propulsion
! 
|- style="background:white; color:black"
|Leiger|Rohuküla–Heltermaa(Hiiumaa route)
|2016–
|Sefine shipyard, Turkey
|Heltermaa
|700 passengers,150 cars
|Diesel
|
|- style="background:white; color:black"
|Piret|Virtsu–Kuivastu(Saaremaa route)
|2017–
|Remontowa shipyard, Poland
|Kuivastu
|700 passengers,150 cars
|Diesel
|
|-style="background:white; color:black"
|Tiiu|Rohuküla–Heltermaa(Hiiumaa route)
|2017–
|Sefine shipyard, Turkey
|Heltermaa
|700 passengers,150 cars
|Diesel
|
|- style="background:white; color:black"
|Tõll 
|Virtsu–Kuivastu(Saaremaa route)
|2017–
|Remontowa shipyard, Poland
|Kuivastu
|700 passengers,150 cars
|HybridElectric/diesel
|
|- style="background:white; color:black"
|Regula'
|Reserve ferry
|2016– 
|Meyer Werft, Germany
|Roomassaare
|400 passengers,105 cars
|Diesel
|
|- style="background:white; color:black"
|}

See also
 Kihnu Veeteed

References

External links
 
 Articles about TS Laevad on ERR News
 Youtube video of Tõll colliding with the berth at Kuivastu

Ferry companies of Estonia
Saaremaa